"Bottle of Red Wine" is an uptempo blues rock song, written and recorded by the British rock musician Eric Clapton for his eponymous studio album Eric Clapton in 1970 under Polydor Records. The recording was produced by Delaney Bramlett and is of a three-minute and six second duration. Polydor Records released the song as the B-side to the 1970 single release "Blues Power". The song is written in the key of C major, played with the blues scale. Music critic Robert Christgau notes, that the tune does not deserve a "classic status". The title is also included on the 1972 compilation album Eric Clapton at His Best.

References

1970 songs
Eric Clapton songs
Polydor Records singles
Songs written by Eric Clapton
Song recordings produced by Delaney Bramlett